Type 90 may refer to:

Japanese weaponry
 Type 90 75 mm field gun, 1932–1945
 Type 90 240 mm railway gun 1930–1945
 Type 90 tank, from 1990
 Type 90 Ship-to-Ship Missile, from 1990
 61 cm Type 90 torpedo, used during World War II
 Nambu Type 90, a flare gun 1930s–1940s
 Nakajima A2N or Navy Type 90 Carrier Fighter, a carrier-borne fighter of the 1930s

Chinese weaponry
 Type 90 AFV, an armoured fighting vehicle
 Type-90 cluster munition, a submunition for cluster rockets
 Type 90-II and Type 90-IIM, versions of the Al-Khalid tank 
 Type 90, version of the Swiss Oerlikon GDF 35 mm twin cannon

See also
 T-90, Russian main battle tank